Mike Lambrecht (born May 2, 1963) is a former American football defensive tackle. He played for the Miami Dolphins from 1987 to 1989 and for the Ottawa Rough Riders in 1990.

References

1963 births
Living people
People from Watertown, Minnesota
Players of American football from Minnesota
American football defensive tackles
St. Cloud State Huskies football players
Miami Dolphins players
Ottawa Rough Riders players
National Football League replacement players